Kepulauan Togean National Park is a largely marine national park, including the Togian Islands, near Sulawesi island of Indonesia.

References

National parks of Indonesia
Sulawesi
Protected areas established in 2004
Marine parks of Indonesia
Geography of Central Sulawesi